Saharsa Assembly constituency is an assembly constituency in Saharsa district in the Indian state of Bihar.

Overview
As per Delimitation of Parliamentary and Assembly constituencies Order, 2008, No. 75 Saharsa Assembly constituency  is composed of the following: Kahara community development block including Saharsa nagar parishad; Saur Bazar CD Block. In 2015 Bihar Legislative Assembly election, Saharsa will be one of the 36 seats to have VVPAT enabled electronic voting machines.

Saharsa Assembly constituency is part of No. 13 Madhepura (Lok Sabha constituency) .

Members of Legislative Assembly

Election Results

2020

References

External links
 

Assembly constituencies of Bihar
Politics of Saharsa district